In enzymology, a hydrogen-sulfide S-acetyltransferase is an enzyme that catalyzes the chemical reaction

acetyl-CoA + hydrogen sulfide  CoA + thioacetate

Thus, the two substrates of this enzyme are acetyl-CoA and hydrogen sulfide, whereas its two products are CoA and thioacetate.

This enzyme belongs to the family of transferases, specifically those acyltransferases transferring groups other than aminoacyl groups.  The systematic name of this enzyme class is acetyl-CoA:hydrogen-sulfide S-acetyltransferase. This enzyme is also called hydrogen-sulfide acetyltransferase.

References

 

EC 2.3.1
Enzymes of unknown structure